Ali Reza Razm Hosseini (born 1961) is an Iranian politician and former Minister of Industry, Mines and Business from September 29, 2020 to August 25, 2021. He was the governor of  Khorasan Razavi Province from January 2019 to September 2020 and also governor of Kerman Province from 2013 to 2018. He was serving in the Government of Hassan Rouhani from 2013 to 2021.

Early life and education 
Hosseini was born in Kerman in Kerman Province. After the Islamic Revolution he was one of the founders of Kerman students’ Islamic Association Union formation and the first elected president of this formation in 1979.

References

1961 births
Governors of Kerman Province
People from Kerman
Living people